Benedetto Patellaro (born 9 January 1960) is an Italian former professional racing cyclist. He rode in one edition of the Tour de France and five editions of the Giro d'Italia.

References

External links
 

1960 births
Living people
People from Monreale
Italian male cyclists
Sportspeople from the Province of Palermo
Cyclists from Sicily